John Riley (1937–1978) was a poet who was associated with the British Poetry Revival.

Riley was born and grew up in Leeds. He served in the Royal Air Force from 1956 to 1958 and then attended Pembroke College, Cambridge, graduating in 1961. He then worked as a teacher in various schools around the Cambridge area. During this period, he became acquainted with many of the poets who made up the Cambridge group, one of the key elements of the Revival.

He left to take up a teaching post near Oxford in 1966. That same year, he set up the Grosseteste Press with his friend Tim Longville. The pair started a magazine, Grosseteste Review, two years later. Riley retired from teaching in 1970 and returned to Leeds to write full-time. In 1977, he was received into the Eastern Orthodox Church. He was murdered in a robbery near his home on the night of October 27–28, 1978.

Riley's poetry was influenced by Charles Olson and Osip Mandelshtam, whose poetry he translated into English. His first book, Ancient and Modern was published in 1967 and the posthumous The Collected Works in 1980. The latter includes the first full printing of his major long poem, Czargrad. A Selected Poems was published by Carcanet Press in 1995.

Notes

1937 births
1978 deaths
British Poetry Revival
Alumni of Pembroke College, Cambridge
20th-century English poets
English male poets
20th-century English male writers
21st-century English male writers